Death Goes North is an American-Canadian action western film directed by Frank McDonald and starring Edgar Edwards, Sheila Bromley and James McGrath. The film was produced in spring of 1937, but released belatedly on July 1, 1939.

Cast

References

Bibliography
 Mike Gasher. Hollywood North: The Feature Film Industry in British Columbia. UBC Press, 2002.

External links
 
 
  (public domain)

1939 films
1930s action films
American action films
Canadian action films
American Western (genre) films
Canadian Western (genre) films
1939 Western (genre) films
English-language Canadian films
Films directed by Frank McDonald
Columbia Pictures films
Canadian black-and-white films
American black-and-white films
Rin Tin Tin
Royal Canadian Mounted Police in fiction
1930s American films
1930s Canadian films